George Henry Ward (15 August 1908 – 1981) was an English footballer who played as a wing half in the football league for Rochdale, as well as non-league football for various other clubs.

References

English footballers
Rochdale A.F.C. players
Macclesfield Town F.C. players
Stafford Rangers F.C. players
1908 births
1981 deaths